Democratic Party of Greens (DSZ) is a green and Eurosceptic political party in the Czech Republic. It was founded on 10 March 2009 as a split from the Green Party, led by two Green MPs, Olga Zubová and Věra Jakubková, who opposed the party's participation in the centre-right government of Mirek Topolánek.

For the 2010 Czech legislative election, the party created an alliance with the Head Up – Electoral Bloc, but did not qualify for representation in the Chamber of Deputies. For 2017 Czech legislative election, the party allied with the Party of Common Sense, but again failed to enter parliament.

References

External links

Green political parties in the Czech Republic
Green conservative parties
Eurosceptic parties in the Czech Republic
2009 establishments in the Czech Republic
Political parties established in 2009
Green Party (Czech Republic) breakaway groups